Pitt County is a county located in the inner banks (northeastern part) of the U.S. state of North Carolina. As of the 2020 census, the population was 170,243, making it the fourteenth-most populous county in North Carolina. Its county seat is Greenville.

Pitt County comprises the Greenville, NC Metropolitan Statistical Area. As one of the fastest-growing centers in the state, the county has seen a population boom since 1990.

History
The county was formed in 1760 from Beaufort County, though the legislative act that created it did not become effective until January 1, 1761. It was named for William Pitt the Elder, who was then Secretary of State for the Southern Department and Leader of the House of Commons. William Pitt was an English statesman and orator, born in London, England. He studied at Oxford University and in 1731 joined the army. Pitt led the young "Patriot" Whigs and in 1756 became secretary of state, where he was a pro-freedom speaker in British Colonial government. He served as Prime Minister of Great Britain in 1766–68.

Geography

State and local protected areas 
 North Carolina Museum of Natural Science Contentnea Creek
 North Carolina Museum of Natural Science Greenvillle

Major water bodies 
 Contentnea Creek
 Creeping Swamp 
 Fork Creek
 Middle River
 Neuse River
 Swift Creek
 Tar River
 Tranters Creek

Adjacent counties
 Martin County – northeast
 Beaufort County – east
 Craven County – south-southeast
 Lenoir County – south-southwest
 Greene County – southwest
 Wilson County – west
 Edgecombe County – northwest

Major highways

Major infrastructure
 G.K. Butterfield Transportation Center
 Pitt-Greenville Airport

Demographics

2020 census

As of the 2020 United States census, there were 170,243 people, 70,926 households, and 41,427 families residing in the county.

2000 census
As of the census of 2000, there were 133,798 people, 52,539 households, and 32,258 families residing in the county.  The population density was 205 people per square mile (79/km2).  There were 58,408 housing units at an average density of 90 per square mile (35/km2).  The racial makeup of the county was 62.08% White, 33.65% Black or African American, 0.27% Native American, 1.08% Asian, 0.04% Pacific Islander, 1.80% from other races, and 1.09% from two or more races.  3.15% of the population were Hispanic or Latino of any race.

There were 52,539 households, out of which 29.90% had children under the age of 18 living with them, 43.40% were married couples living together, 14.40% had a female householder with no husband present, and 38.60% were non-families. 28.30% of all households were made up of individuals, and 7.30% had someone living alone who was 65 years of age or older.  The average household size was 2.43 and the average family size was 3.02.

In the county, the population was spread out, with 23.60% under the age of 18, 17.50% from 18 to 24, 29.90% from 25 to 44, 19.40% from 45 to 64, and 9.60% who were 65 years of age or older.  The median age was 30 years. For every 100 females there were 90.20 males.  For every 100 females age 18 and over, there were 86.40 males.

The median income for a household in the county was $32,868, and the median income for a family was $43,971. Males had a median income of $31,962 versus $25,290 for females. The per capita income for the county was $18,243.  About 13.50% of families and 20.30% of the population were below the poverty line, including 21.60% of those under age 18 and 20.20% of those age 65 or over.

As of the census of 2010, there were 168,148 people residing in Pitt County, a 25.7% increase since 2000.  Females made up 52.8% of the population.  Caucasians make up 58.9% of the population, followed by African-Americans at 34.1%, Asian persons at 1.6%, American Indian or Alaskan at 0.3%, Hispanic at 5.5%, and Native Hawaiian or Other Pacific Islander at 0.1%.  From the period of 2005 to 2009, the number of foreign-born people living in the county was at 4%.

The high school graduation rate in the county among citizens over the age of twenty-five from 2005 to 2009 was steady at 85%, while the percentage of those aged twenty-five and up with a bachelor's degree in the county was only 28.7% in the county during the same period of time.

In 2009, the median household income in Pitt County was $36,339, over $7,000 less than the North Carolina number and about 25.5% of Pitt County residents were at or below the poverty level.  The per capita money income, in terms of 2009 dollars, in the past twelve months from 2005 to 2009 in Pitt County was $21,622, about $3,000 less than the North Carolina average.

Government and politics
In the early twentieth century Pitt was a typical Democratic "Solid South" county, where there were large numbers of disenfranchised blacks and the small white electorate voted overwhelming majorities for the Democratic Party. Pitt voted for the Democratic Party in every election from at least 1876 until American Independent candidate George Wallace gained a plurality in 1968. Apart from Richard Nixon's overwhelming victory over George McGovern in 1972, Pitt has since been a closely contested swing county, with no major party candidate post-McGovern falling under forty percent. After 1976, when Jimmy Carter carried it, and aside from a victory in 1992 by Bill Clinton, Pitt County tended to vote for Republicans until 2008. Since 2008 it has voted for the Democratic Party.

Pitt County is a member of the Mid-East Commission regional council of governments.

Pitt County is represented by Donald G. Davis in the 5th District in the North Carolina State Senate. as well as Kandie Smith in the 8th district and Brian Farkas in the 9th District in the North Carolina State House of Representatives.

Education

Private 
Private schools in Pitt County include:
 Brookhaven SDA School
 Calvary Christian Academy
 Children's Montessori School
 Christ Covenant School
 Community Christian Academy
 Faith Christian Academy
 Greenville Christian Academy
 Greenville Montessori School
 John Paul II Catholic HS
 The Oakwood School
 Roseleaf Academy
 Saint Peter Catholic School
 Trinity Christian School

Public 
Public schools in Pitt County are managed by Pitt County Schools.

Elementary schools 
 Ayden Elementary School
 Belvoir Elementary School
 Creekside Elementary School
 Eastern Elementary School
 Elmhurst Elementary School
 Falkland Elementary School
 H. B. Sugg School (K–2)
 Lake Forest Elementary School
 Northwest Elementary School
 Ridgewood Elementary School
 Sam D. Bundy School (3–5)
 South Greenville Elementary School
 W. H. Robinson Elementary School
 Wahl-Coates Elementary School
 Wintergreen Intermediate School (3–5)
 Wintergreen Primary School (K–2)

K–8 schools 
 Bethel School
 Chicod School
 G. R. Whitfield School
 Grifton School
 Pactolus School
 Stokes School

Middle schools 
 A. G. Cox Middle School
 Ayden Middle School
 C. M. Eppes Middle School
 E. B. Aycock Middle School
 Farmville Middle School
 Hope Middle School
 Wellcome Middle School

High schools 
 Ayden-Grifton High School
 D. H. Conley High School
 Farmville Central High School
 J. H. Rose High School
 North Pitt High School
 South Central High School

Alternative schools 
 Pitt County Schools Early College High School

Post-secondary schools 
 East Carolina University
 Pitt Community College
 Miller-Motte Technical College

Communities

Cities
 Greenville (county seat and largest city)

Towns
 Ayden
 Bethel
 Falkland
 Farmville
 Fountain
 Grifton
 Grimesland
 Simpson
 Winterville

Census-designated places
 Bell Arthur
 Belvoir
 Stokes

Unincorporated communities
 Bell's Fork
 Black Jack
 Chicod
 House
 Pactolus

Townships

 Arthur
 Ayden
 Belvoir
 Bethel
 Black Jack
 Carolina (Stokes)
 Chicod
 Falkland
 Farmville
 Fountain
 Greenville
 Grifton
 Grimesland
 Pactolus
 Simpson
 Swift Creek
 Winterville

See also
 List of counties in North Carolina
 National Register of Historic Places listings in Pitt County, North Carolina
 Norfolk Southern Railway, Historic railway that had a route from Greenville to Raleigh, Wake County.
 List of future Interstate Highways

References

Further reading
 Kahrl, Andrew W., "The 'Negro Park' Question: Land, Labor, and Leisure in Pitt County, North Carolina, 1920–1930," Journal of Southern History (Feb. 2013) 79#1 pp 113–42.

External links

 
 
 Pitt County Economic Development website
 NCGenWeb Pitt County – free genealogy resources for the county

 
Greenville, North Carolina metropolitan area
1760 establishments in North Carolina
Populated places established in 1760